Austria participated in the Eurovision Song Contest in 2011 with the song "The Secret Is Love" written by Thomas Rabitsch and Nadine Beiler. The song was performed by Nadine Beiler. In July 2010, the Austrian broadcaster Österreichischer Rundfunk (ORF) announced that they would be returning to the Eurovision Song Contest after a three-year absence following their withdrawal in 2008. ORF organised the national final Düsseldorf - wir kommen! in order to select the Austrian entry for the 2011 contest in Düsseldorf, Germany. Thirty songs competed in an online voting round titled Guten Morgen Düsseldorf, of which ten were selected to proceed to the national final. The ten songs competed in a televised show where two rounds of public voting selected the winner. The first round selected the top three entries to proceed to the second round, during which "The Secret Is Love" performed by Nadine Beiler was selected as the winner after gaining 46.73% of the votes.

Austria was drawn to compete in the first semi-final of the Eurovision Song Contest which took place on 12 May 2011. Performing during the show in position 2, "The Secret Is Love" was announced among the top 10 entries of the second semi-final and therefore qualified to compete in the final on 14 May. This marked the first time that Austria qualified to the final of the Eurovision Song Contest from a semi-final since the introduction of semi-finals in 2004. It was later revealed that Austria placed seventh out of the 19 participating countries in the semi-final with 69 points. In the final, Austria performed in position 18 and placed eighteenth out of the 25 participating countries, scoring 64 points.

Background

The Austrian national broadcaster, Österreichischer Rundfunk (ORF), broadcasts the event within Austria and organises the selection process for the nation's entry. Following the 2007 contest, the Austrian broadcaster announced in November 2007 that the country would not participate in 2008 citing poor results in the 2007 contest and declining interest as reasons for their decision. The nation also did not participate in 2009 and 2010, with ORF Head of Entertainment Edgar Böhm stating that the newly introduced semi-final format "still incorporates a mix of countries who will be politically favoured in the voting process". Following their three-year absence, ORF confirmed their intentions to participate at the 2011 Eurovision Song Contest on 27 July 2010. From 2002 to 2005, ORF had set up national finals with several artists to choose both the song and performer to compete at Eurovision for Austria. In 2007, ORF held an internal selection to choose the artist and song to represent Austria at the contest. On 26 October 2010, the broadcaster also announced that the Austrian entry for the 2011 contest would be selected through a national final.

Before Eurovision

Düsseldorf - wir kommen! 
Düsseldorf - wir kommen! (Düsseldorf - here we come!) was the national final that selected Austria's entry for the Eurovision Song Contest 2011. The competition took place on 25 February 2011 at the ORF Center in Vienna, hosted by Mirjam Weichselbraun and Robert Kratky with Andi Knoll hosting from the green room. The show was broadcast on ORF eins as well as streamed online via ORF's official website and the official Eurovision Song Contest website eurovision.tv. The first part of the national final was watched by 736,000 viewers in Austria with a market share of 26%, while the second part was watched by 818,000 viewers in Austria with a market share of 37%.

Format 
Thirty songs competed in an online selection titled Guten Morgen Düsseldorf (Good Morning Düsseldorf), where public voting and an expert jury panel consisting of representatives of the radio channel Ö3 selected ten entries for the national final. After the combination of the jury and public votes which each distributed points from 1 to 30 based on overall ranking, the top ten ranked entries proceeded to the national final where the winner was selected over two rounds of public voting. In the first round, the top two entries were selected to advance to the second round, during which the winner was selected. The public was able to vote via SMS during the online selection, while viewers of the national final were able to vote via telephone or SMS.

Competing entries 
ORF invited all interested artists to submit their songs to the broadcaster between 26 October 2010 and 10 December 2010. Each application was required to be backed by at least 33 people in order to be eligible for consideration. The public was also able to nominate artists for the national final on the same condition that they were backed by at least 33 people. All applications were posted on Ö3's official website, which included entries from former Austrian Eurovision representatives Hans Kreuzmayr–Waterloo (1976), Josef Krassnitzer–Robinson (1976), Petra Frey (1994), Alf Poier (2003) and di Bernando (2004 as part of Tie Break). The broadcaster received 210 submissions at the close of the deadline, which were reviewed by the Ö3 team led by Head of Ö3 Georg Spatt that selected 30 entries to compete in the online selection. The thirty artists and songs were revealed on 3 January 2011.

Guten Morgen Düsseldorf 
The thirty competing songs were posted on Ö3's official website for a public voting period that ran between 3 and 31 January 2011. The top ten ranked entries selected by the combination of votes from a jury panel and the public vote to compete in the national final were revealed on 1 February 2011.

National final
The televised national final took place on 25 February 2011. Ten songs competed in the first round where the top three were selected by a public vote to proceed to the second round. The top three were "Oida Taunz" performed by Trackshittaz, "Paris, Paris" performed by Klimmstein feat. Joe Sumner and "The Secret Is Love" performed by Nadine Beiler. In the second round, public televoting selected "The Secret Is Love" performed by Nadine Beiler as the winner.

At Eurovision

All countries except the "Big Five" (France, Germany, Italy, Spain and the United Kingdom), and the host country, are required to qualify from one of two semi-finals in order to compete for the final; the top ten countries from each semi-final progress to the final. The European Broadcasting Union (EBU) split up the competing countries into six different pots based on voting patterns from previous contests, with countries with favourable voting histories put into the same pot. On 17 January 2011, a special allocation draw was held which placed each country into one of the two semi-finals, as well as which half of the show they would perform in. Austria was placed into the second semi-final, to be held on 12 May 2011, and was scheduled to perform in the first half of the show. The running order for the semi-finals was decided through another draw on 15 March 2011 and Austria was set to perform in position 2, following the entry from Bosnia and Herzegovina and before the entry from the Netherlands.

The two semi-finals and the final were broadcast in Austria on ORF eins with commentary by Andi Knoll and via radio on Ö3 with commentary by Martin Blumenau and Benny Hörtnagl. The Austrian spokesperson, who announced the Austrian votes during the final, was Kati Bellowitsch.

Semi-final 
Nadine Beiler took part in technical rehearsals on 3 and 6 May, followed by dress rehearsals on 11 and 12 May. This included the jury show on 11 May where the professional juries of each country watched and voted on the competing entries.

The Austrian performance featured Nadine Beiler performing on stage in a short black dress with gemstones and Swarovski crystals attached, with flying diamonds on a black background appearing on the LED screens as well as a revolving star appearing on the stage floor. During the performance, Beiler performed on a crystallised platform accompanied by smoke effects. Nadine Beiler was joined by five backing vocalists on stage: Anne Semper, Juliane Janoska, Karin Ziegelwanger, Maria Rerych and Renee Benson.

At the end of the show, Austria was announced as having finished in the top 10 and subsequently qualifying for the grand final. This marked the first time that Austria qualified to the final of the Eurovision Song Contest from a semi-final since the introduction of semi-finals in 2004. It was later revealed that Austria placed seventh in the semi-final, receiving a total of 69 points.

Final 
Shortly after the second semi-final, a winners' press conference was held for the ten qualifying countries. As part of this press conference, the qualifying artists took part in a draw to determine the running order for the final. This draw was done in the order the countries were announced during the semi-final. Austria was drawn to perform in position 18, following the entry from Romania and before the entry from Azerbaijan.

Nadine Beiler once again took part in dress rehearsals on 13 and 14 May before the final, including the jury final where the professional juries cast their final votes before the live show. Nadine Beiler performed a repeat of her semi-final performance during the final on 14 May. At the conclusion of the voting, Austria finished in eighteenth place with 64 points.

Voting 
Voting during the three shows consisted of 50 percent public televoting and 50 percent from a jury deliberation. The jury consisted of five music industry professionals who were citizens of the country they represent. This jury was asked to judge each contestant based on: vocal capacity; the stage performance; the song's composition and originality; and the overall impression by the act. In addition, no member of a national jury could be related in any way to any of the competing acts in such a way that they cannot vote impartially and independently.

Following the release of the full split voting by the EBU after the conclusion of the competition, it was revealed that Austria had placed twenty-fourth with the public televote and fifth with the jury vote in the final. In the public vote, Austria scored 25 points, while with the jury vote, Austria scored 145 points. In the second semi-final, Austria placed tenth with the public televote with 52 points and fourth with the jury vote, scoring 95 points.

Below is a breakdown of points awarded to Austria and awarded by Austria in the second semi-final and grand final of the contest. The nation awarded its 12 points to Bosnia and Herzegovina in the semi-final and the final of the contest.

Points awarded to Austria

Points awarded by Austria

After Eurovision 
"The Secret Is Love", which entered Austria's Ö3 Top 40 singles chart at number 9 on 11 March 2011, peaked again at number 9 on 27 May 2011. The song also entered Germany's official charts the same day, peaking at number 71.

Notes and references

Notes

References

External links 
 Ö3 Guten Morgen Düsseldorf! (presentation of the artists' entries)

2011
Countries in the Eurovision Song Contest 2011
Eurovision